The Basingstoke Bison are an English Ice Hockey club from Basingstoke. They currently compete in the  NIHL National League and have previously been members of the Ice Hockey Superleague and its successor the Elite Ice Hockey League.

History 
Formed in 1988 as the Basingstoke Beavers, the club became the "Bison" in 1995. Their team logo is very similar to that used by the Buffalo Sabres from 1996–2006. Joining the Superleague in 1996, the Bison dropped out in 1998 and joined the British National League. In 2003 they joined the newly formed Elite Ice Hockey League.

Despite being one of the lower-budget teams in the EIHL, the Bison maintained their fan base and greatly enhanced local sponsorships and doubled their season ticket sales. This success is mainly testament to the hard work of Mark Bernard, who occupied the general manager and head coach role with the club during the 2004/05 and 2005/06 seasons. Bernard also stepped into the netminder's role part way through the latter season after Jayme Platt had left the team.

In May 2006, Bernard left the club to take up the assistant general manager's post with American Hockey League club, the Norfolk Admirals. Prior to his departure, Bernard secured the services of a number of the players that made up the 05/06 roster.

In June 2006, Planet Ice announced that the new player/coach of the club would be former club captain Doug Sheppard, with former Bison and London Racers defenceman Duncan Dalmao returning as player/assistant coach. Sheppard set about building his roster around the core that he had inherited from Bernard. The Bison embarked upon a successful year under Sheppard, securing their highest ever Elite League finish, and taking many points off the top sides in the League.

In April 2007, David Taylor, owner of the Bracknell Bees, purchased the Bison. He appointed Ryan Aldridge as the head coach of the team, signalling the end of Doug Shepherd's reign. Shepherd went on to join rivals Sheffield Steelers.

Following financial problems, which had resulted in the departure of a number of players (including starting netminder Stevie Lyle), Taylor relinquished ownership of the Bison and the team's new owner was announced as Tomas Enerston by Planet Ice on 8 November 2007. Less than a year later, following further financial difficulty, Planet Ice put together a rescue package to keep Bison on the ice until the end of the 2008/09 season.

On 25 March 2009, the Bison released a statement confirming that they would be joining the EPL for the 2009/10 season. Entry to the EPIHL was confirmed on 15 April 2009, and Steve Moria took over as head coach the following day.

After Moria's departure at the end of the 2011–2012 season, it was announced that Doug Sheppard would return as the Bison head coach for the 2012–2013 season. In March 2013, Sheppard signed another deal with the Basingstoke Bison to continue as head coach for the 2013–2014 season.

The Basingstoke Bison won the 15/16 English Premier League title, under Doug Sheppard as coach. This ended their silverware drought of 23 years.

The 2017/18 season was arguably the Bison's greatest ever season. Remaining under Doug Sheppard, they secured a historic treble by winning the NIHL 1 South league, NIHL 1 South playoffs and finally the NIHL Final Four playoffs.

In 2018/19, the Bison had a major squad rebuild, with just 7 players remaining at the club from the previous season. With Doug Sheppard joining rivals Bracknell Bees, the Bison brought in British ice hockey veteran Ashley Tait as a player-coach. With Coventry Blaze legend Russell Cowley and imports Richard Bordowski and Michal Klejna, the Bison achieved an unlikely 3rd place finish in the league, and made their way to the cup final, which they lost to the Peterborough Phantoms.

Club roster 2022-23
(*) Denotes a Non-British Trained player (Import)

2021/22 Outgoing

Honoured members
Basingstoke have only retired the number of two players, the first being Kevin Conway's number 10 in 2005 following his initial retirement from ice hockey. In the 2005–06 season, Tony Redmond was honoured with a testimonial season.  In September 2009, it was announced that Don Yewchin, the original ice hockey coordinator for the Beavers in 1988 would have his number 12 jersey retired before Basingstoke's league game with local rivals Bracknell Bees on Saturday 10 October 2009. In a fantastic twist of fate, Basingstoke won the game 12–0. In 2016, Tony Redmond's number 20 shirt was retired when the club beat Telford Tigers 7-0. In 2018, the club held a testimonial match to celebrate Kurt Reynolds, as he took a time-out from hockey.

Team honours 
1989/90
Champions – English Div 1 Promotion Play-offs
1991/92
Winners – Southern Cup
1992/93
Champions – Heineken Division One
Champions – Heineken Div 1 Promotion Play-offs
Runners-up – Southern Cup
1993/94
Runners-up – Southern Cup
1994/95
Runners-up – Southern Cup
1998/99
Runners-up – British National Ice Hockey League
Runners-up – Christmas Cup
1999/00
Winners – B & H Plate
Runners-up – ntl: Christmas Cup
Runners-up – BNL Play-off Championships
2000/01
Winners – B & H Plate
Runners-up – Findus British National Ice Hockey League
Runners-up – FBNL Play-off Championships
2003/04
EIHL First Team All Star – Curtis Cruickshank
2012/13
Runners-up – English Premier Ice Hockey League
2013/14
Winners – English Premier Ice Hockey League Cup
Runners-up – English Premier Ice Hockey League
Winners – English Premier Ice Hockey League Play-off Championship
2015/16
Champions – English Premier Ice Hockey League
2017/18
Champions – NIHL Britton League Division 1
Champions - NIHL Britton League Play-Offs
Champions - NIHL National Final Four Play-Offs

Past head coaches
Ashley Tait – 2018 – present – Player / head coach
Doug Sheppard – 2012 – 2018 – Player / head coach
Steve Moria – 2009–2012 – Player / head coach
Ryan Aldridge – 2007–2009 – Player / head coach
Doug Sheppard – 2006–2007 – Player / head coach
Mark Bernard – 2004–2006 – Player / head coach / general manager
Steve Moria – 2002–2004 – Player / head coach
Charlie Colon – 2000–2002 – Head coach
Rick Strachan – 1999–2000 – Player / head coach
Don Depoe – 1998–1999 – Head coach

Notable players
Darcy Anderson
Derek Campbell
Brad Cruikshank
Mark DeSantis
Jason Goulet
Jason Hewitt
Wes Jarvis
David Kozier
Dean Melanson
Dwight Parrish
Jayme Platt
Brent Pope
Steve Thornton
David Vychodil
Ben Davies

Footnotes

External links 
 Basingstoke Bison web site
 Bolt Action Media – Bison's Media providers web site

Sport in Basingstoke
Ice hockey teams in England
Ice hockey clubs established in 1988
Former Elite Ice Hockey League teams
EPIHL teams
1988 establishments in England